Denise Drace-Brownell is an American businessperson and author.

Career
Denise Drace-Brownell has a B.S. from the University of Illinois, J.D. from Rutgers University with study at the University of Pennsylvania, and MPH from Columbia University. She is also the CEO and Founder of DDB Technology, and has served in the M&A unit of Akzo Nobel. She also served as the Executive Director of the Northeast Interstate Low-Level Radioactive Waste Compact Commission during the 1980s, a northeastern governmental compact formed between the states of New Jersey and Connecticut.

Books
She is the co-author of The First Nazi: Erich Ludendorff, the Man Who Made Hitler Possible, written with co-author Will Brownell. The book follows the historical life of Erich Ludendorff, and focuses on his dictator-style leadership in Germany during and after the First World War. Their focus on Ludendorff’s anti-Semitism describes how his career prepared the Germans psychologically for Nazi rule, and on decisions such as allowing Vladimir Lenin to return to Russia from exile in Switzerland. Kirkus Reviews said of the book that, "Despite a dearth of material, the authors deliver a chilling, well-researched biography that opens a whole new window on the world wars and the German psyche at the time." The book has been translated into German, Italian, Chinese and Czech.

Personal life
Drace-Brownell’s struggle with, and treatment of, binocular vision disorder was the subject of an article by Lambeth Hochwald, which appeared in Reader's Digest. She developed a form of eye glasses that can help with the disorder.

References

American military writers
Rutgers School of Law–Camden alumni
University of Illinois alumni
Columbia University Mailman School of Public Health alumni
American women chief executives
University of Pennsylvania alumni